Sillygomania is the second studio album by Belgian singer Loïc Nottet. It was released on 29 May 2020 by Sony Music. The album includes the singles "Doctor", "On Fire", "29", "Heartbreaker", "Mr/Mme" and "Twym".

Background
In February 2020, Nottet announced his new album on his Instagram account, he said, "And here it is! I'm so happy to present to you all the cover of my new album: SILLYGOMANIA! I know that many of you have been waiting a long time for this and I really hope that this appetizer will live up to your expectations! Thank you for your patience and dedication to my team and I ! I can never thank you enough for the chance and the life you have given me!".

Track listing

Charts

Weekly charts

Year-end charts

Release history

References

2020 albums
Loïc Nottet albums